Franklin J. Gutierrez is a Guamanian politician who served senator in the Guam Legislatures for 3 consecutive terms and also served as the vice speaker from 1987 to 1989. He is the member of Democratic Party of Guam.

Early life
Franklin J. Gutierrez was born to Tomas Taitano Gutierrez and Rita Toves Benavente Cruz and was raised in Agana Heights. One of his ten siblings is former Governor Carl T.C. Gutierrez.

Guam Legislature
Gutierrez first ran for senator in 1982. Placing 8th in the Democratic primary, he advanced to the general election. Gutierrez placed 9th in the general election, winning a seat in the 17th Guam Legislature. He was reelected to 2 terms.

Elections

Leadership
Gutierrez served as Vice Speaker of the Guam Legislature from 1987-1989 during the 19th Guam Legislature.

References

20th-century American politicians
Chamorro people
Guamanian Democrats
Living people
Members of the Legislature of Guam
Year of birth missing (living people)